HD 164712, also known as HR 6731 is an orange hued star located in the southern constellation of Apus. It has an apparent magnitude of 5.86, making it faintly visible to the naked eye if viewed under ideal conditons.

HD 164712 has a stellar classification of K2 III, indicating that it is a red giant. David Stanley Evans gave it a slightly cooler class of K3 III. Gaia Data Release 3 models place it on the bump of red giant branch, a period of temporary contraction. At present it has 1.15 times the mass of the Sun but at an age of 4.54 billion years, it has expanded to 9.09 times its girth. HD 164712 is a thick disk star with an iron abundance 73% above solar level. This makes it metal enriched.

HR 6731 has two faint companions. The first one is a background object while the other one appears to be physically related. As for HD 164712, it shows indications of an infrared excess, suggesting there may be a dusty disk in orbit around the star.

References

External links
 Image HD 164712

Apus (constellation)
164712
K-type giants
6731
089115
CD-75 01016
High-proper-motion stars
Double stars